Walther Oskar Ernst Amelung (15 October 1865 – 12 September 1927) was a German classical archaeologist who was a native of Stettin. Amelung specialized in investigations of ancient Greek and Roman sculpture.

Starting in 1884 he studied at the University of Tübingen under Erwin Rohde (1845-98), and afterwards in Leipzig with Johannes Overbeck (1825-1895) and at Munich under Heinrich Brunn (1822-1894). From 1891 to 1893 he performed research of ancient sculpture during journeys throughout the Mediterranean region.
In 1895 he began work with the German Archaeological Institute (DAI) in Rome, where one of his duties was to catalog the sculpture collection of the Vatican.

During World War I, Amelung was tasked with restoration of plaster casts of classical sculptures in the museum at the University of Berlin, and after the war was in charge of reconstruction of the DAI's library in Rome. With art dealer Paul Arndt (1865-1937), he was co-editor of Photographische Einzelaufnahmen antiker Skulpturen, which was a survey of Greek and Roman sculpture. He died on 12 September 1927 in Bad Nauheim.

References 
 Dictionary of Art Historians (biography)

1865 births
1927 deaths
19th-century German archaeologists
People from Szczecin
People from the Province of Pomerania
Burials in the Protestant Cemetery, Rome
20th-century German archaeologists
Members of the Göttingen Academy of Sciences and Humanities